Wołosaty is a left tributary of the San River in southeastern Poland, which is meets in Stuposiany very near the border with Ukraine.  It flows for 27.8 kilometres.

Rivers of Poland
Rivers of Podkarpackie Voivodeship